Yanam is a town in Union Territory of Puducherry, India.

Yanam may also refer to:

In India
Yanaon, a colony of French India from 1723 to 1954
Yanam district, a district in the Union Territory of Puducherry, India
Yanam (Union Territory Assembly constituency), the electoral constituency representing the above district
Yanam Municipality, an elected body for the administration of Yanam

Other
Yanam language, a Yanomaman language of Brazil and Venezuela